Timur Zinurovich Sakharov (born 19 July 1998) is a Russian football player. He plays for FC Yenisey-2 Krasnoyarsk.

Club career
He made his debut in the Russian Football National League for FC Yenisey Krasnoyarsk on 5 August 2017 in a game against FC Spartak-2 Moscow.

References

External links
 
 Profile by Russian Football National League

1998 births
Sportspeople from Krasnoyarsk
Living people
Russian footballers
Association football midfielders
FC Nosta Novotroitsk players
FC Yenisey Krasnoyarsk players
Russian First League players
Russian Second League players